Shue Creek is a stream in the U.S. state of South Dakota.

According to tradition, a lost shoe caused the name to be selected.

See also
List of rivers of South Dakota

References

Rivers of Beadle County, South Dakota
Rivers of Clark County, South Dakota
Rivers of South Dakota